Holy Child Killiney is a voluntary fee-paying Catholic secondary school under the direction of the Society of the Holy Child Jesus in Killiney, a suburban village in Dún Laoghaire–Rathdown, Ireland.

The school was opened in September 1947, on the premises of the former County Hotel, where it is still located.  It initially had 34 pupils, but by 2019 it had 341 pupils.

Notable alumni

 Maeve Binchy (1939–2012), novelist, playwright, short story writer, columnist, and speaker
 Eavan Boland (1944–2020), poet and academic

References

Catholic secondary schools in the Republic of Ireland
Secondary schools in Dún Laoghaire–Rathdown
Private schools in the Republic of Ireland
1947 establishments in Ireland
Educational institutions established in 1947